The following is a timeline of the history of the city of Málaga, Andalusia, Spain.

Ancient History 

 770 BCE -  founded by Phoenicians from Tyre.
 81-84 CE - Lex Malacitana or Lex Flavia Malacitana is given. Malaca was governed under this law, which granted free-born persons the privileges of Roman citizenship.

Middle Ages

Early Middle Ages 
 571 CE - Visigoth Leovigild in power.
 711 CE - Umayyad invasion .
 756 CE - Umayyad Abd al-Rahman I in power.
 907 CE - Mālaqah besieged by forces of Aban son of Abd Allah.

High Middle Ages 
 1035 - Palace of the Alcazaba built.
 1079 - "Conquest of Malaga by Ibn Omar."

Late Middle Ages 
 1232 - Mālaqah becomes part of the Nasrid Kingdom of Granada.
 1350 - Traveler Ibn Battuta visits city.

Modern Period 
 1486 - 4 August: Roman Catholic Diocese of Málaga established.
 1487 - Siege of Málaga (1487); Málaga is incorporated in the Crown of Castile and repopulated.
 1490 - Santiago el Mayor church built.
 1494 - Earthquake.
 1505 - Hospital of Santo Tomas founded.
 1522 - Málaga Cathedral construction begins.
 1540 - Buenavista Palace built.
 1656 - 21 July: Raid on Málaga by English forces.
 1680 - .
 1719 - Málaga Cathedral construction completed.
 1741 - Yellow fever epidemic.
 1757 -  (church) built.
 1782 - Málaga Cathedral construction completed.
 1785 - Consulado (merchant guild) established.
 1790 -  active.

Contemporary Period

19th century 

 1804 - Epidemic.
 1810 - City "sacked by the French.(General Sebastiani"
 1830 - Cementerio Ingles (cemetery) established.
 1831 - 11 December: Execution of rebel José María de Torrijos y Uriarte.
 1834 - Heredia's  iron finery forge begins operating.
 1851 - Escuela Provincial de Bellas Artes (art school) opens.
 1857 - Population: 94,293.
 1854 - Bank of Málaga founded.
 1862 - Córdoba-Málaga railway begins operating.
 1864 - February: Arrest of a Polish ship with weapons and ammunition, organized by Polish émigré activists to support the ongoing Polish January Uprising in partitioned Poland (see also Poland–Spain relations).
 1870 -  (theatre) opens.
 1876 - Plaza de toros de La Malagueta (bullring) built.
 1877 - Population: 115,882.
 1879 -  (market) built.
 1881 - Pablo Picasso born in Malaga.
 1885 -  Socialista Malagueña founded.
 1891
 Calle Marqués de Larios (street) inaugurated.
 English Church built on Avenida de Pries.
 1897 - Sociedad Propagandística del Clima y Embellecimiento de Málaga established.
 1899 -  (monument) erected.
 1900 - Population: city 130,109; province 511,989.

20th century 

 1904
 Málaga Club de Fútbol ("The Anchovies") formed.
  built in  area.

 1907 - September: Flood.
 1908 - Malaga-Vélez-Málaga railway begins operating.
 1919 - Málaga Airport opens.
 1913 - Museo Provincial de Bellas Artes (museum) founded.
 1918 -  built.
 1925 - Alameda Principal opens to traffic.
 1937
 February: Nationalists capture Malaga.
 Boinas Rojas newspaper begins publication.
 1940
 La Tarde newspaper begins publication.
 Population: 238,085.
 1941 - La Rosaleda Stadium opens.
 1945 - Cine Albeniz (cinema) opens.
 1947 - Museo Arqueológico Provincial (museum) founded.
 1949 -  housing construction begins.

 1966 - Cine Astoria (cinema) opens.
 1970 - Population: 374,452.
 1972 - University of Málaga established.
 1973 - Museo de Málaga established.
 1976
  (museum) opens.
 Málaga Centro-Alameda railway station opens.
 1979 - Pedro Aparicio Sánchez becomes mayor.
 1981 - Population: 503,251.
 1982 - 13 September: Spantax airplane crash.
 1988
 Fundación Picasso established.
  (church) built.
 1991 - Orquesta Filarmónica de Málaga (orchestra) active.
 1992
 Andalusia Technology Park (science complex) opens.
 Baloncesto Málaga (basketball team) formed.
 1995 - Celia Villalobos becomes mayor.
 1998 - Málaga Spanish Film Festival begins.
 1999
  begins publication.
 Palacio de Deportes José María Martín Carpena (arena) opens.
 2000
 July: Politician Jose Maria Martin Carpena assassinated.
 Francisco de la Torre (politician) becomes mayor.

21st century 

 2003
 Málaga Metropolitan Transport Consortium established.
 Museo Picasso Málaga opens.
 2004 -  magazine begins publication.
 2006 - 2006 European Cup (athletics) held.
 2009 - Honorary Consulate of Poland opened.
 2010
 29 September: .
 Population: 568,507.
 2011 - Carmen Thyssen Museum opens.

See also
 History of Málaga
 
 Timeline of the Muslim presence in the Iberian Peninsula, circa 8th-15th century CE
 Timelines of other cities in the autonomous community of Andalusia: Almería, Cádiz, Córdoba, Granada, Jaén, Jerez de la Frontera, Seville
 List of municipalities in Andalusia

References

This article incorporates information from the Spanish Wikipedia and Catalan Wikipedia.

Bibliography

in English
Published in the 18th-19th centuries
 
 
 
 
 
 
 

Published in the 20th century
 
 
 
 
 M Barke, M Newton. Promoting sustainable tourism in an urban context: recent developments in Malaga City, Andalusia. Journal of Sustainable Tourism, 1995.
 

Published in the 21st century

in Spanish
  (Historia section)

External links

 Map of Málaga, 1943
 Europeana. Items related to Málaga, various dates.
 Digital Public Library of America. Items related to Málaga, various dates

History of Málaga
malaga